Oltre Giuba or Trans-Juba was an Italian colony in the territory of Jubaland in present-day southern Somalia. It lasted for one year, from 1924 until 1925, when it was absorbed into Italian Somaliland. Trans-juba is the former name of Jubaland, a federal member state of Somalia.

History

Jubaland

Italian Trans-Juba was established in 1924, after the United Kingdom ceded the northern portion of the Jubaland region to Italy as a reward for the Italians having joined the Allies in World War I. The territory thereafter had a brief existence as Trans-Juba (Oltre Giuba) under governor Corrado Zoli (16 July 1924–31 December 1926).

Italy issued its first postage stamps for the new colony on 29 July 1925, consisting of Italian stamps overprinted Oltre Giuba. Britain retained control of the southern half of the partitioned Jubaland territory, which was later called the Northern Frontier District.

In 1925, a year after its formation, Trans-Juba was integrated into Italian Somaliland.

The colony had a total area of 87,000 km² (33,000 sq mi), and in 1926, a population of 120,000 inhabitants. In the capital Kismayo (Chisimaio), there was a small group of Italian settlers, mostly merchants. During this period, the city was the third largest in Somalia and served as a port of call for small military ships.

Bajuni Islands
The Bajuni Islands ("Isole Giuba") were part of British East Africa until World War I. They were transferred to Italy in 1926.

See also
Postage stamps and postal history of Trans-Juba
Italian Somaliland

References

Bibliography
 Vittorio Bottego, Viaggi di scoperta nel cuore dell' Africa: il Giuba esplorato, sotta gli auspici della Società geografica italiana., E. Loescher & c.o, 1895
 Guida dell'Africa Orientale Italiana, Ed. Consociazione Turistica Italiana, Milano 1938, p. 585-596
 Tripodi, Paolo. The Colonial Legacy in Somalia. St. Martin's Press. New York, 1999.

Jubaland
Italy–Somalia relations
Italian East Africa
States and territories established in 1924
1925 disestablishments in the Italian Empire
1924 establishments in the Italian Empire
Former countries of the interwar period